Charles H. Kimball (1852-1887) was an American architect from Maine.

Life
Kimball was born in Lovell in 1852, and was the son of a dentist.  His family moved to Portland when he was very young.  Kimball graduated from Portland High School in 1869.  By 1871 he was working for George M. Harding, a local architect.  In 1874 he left Portland for Lewiston and established a practice with George M. Coombs, a native of that city.  Kimball & Coombs dissolved later that year, and Kimball had opened his own office in Portland by 1875.  He practiced alone until 1887, his death.  He never married.

He is notable as one of the only Maine architects to embrace the Stick Style. His buildings in this mode include the original Deering High School, the Church of the New Jerusalem in Fryeburg, and the former Kezar Falls M. E. Church.

Architectural works

Kimball & Coombs, 1874
 1874 - Albert F. Ames House, 73 Talbot Ave, Rockland, Maine

C. H. Kimball, 1875-1887
 1875 - P. Fox Varnum Houses, Varnum St, Portland, Maine
 Demolished.
 1876 - James E. Wengren House, 11 Mellen St, Portland, Maine
 1877 - Deering High School, 432 Stevens Ave, Deering, Maine
 Demolished.
 1877 - George C. Frye House, 296 Congress St, Portland, Maine
 Demolished.
 1877 - Marble Block, 129 Main St, Biddeford, Maine
 1878 - Church of the New Jerusalem, 4 Oxford St, Fryeburg, Maine
 1880 - Frank L. Bartlett House, 27 Pine St, Portland, Maine
 1880 - Daniel M. Bonney House, 8 Court St, Farmington, Maine
 1881 - Shailer School, 58 North St, Portland, Maine
 1882 - Frontier National Bank Building, 30 Water St, Eastport, Maine
 1883 - Kezar Falls M. E. Church, 5 School St, Kezar Falls, Maine
 1884 - James H. Waugh House, 252 Main St, Farmington, Maine

References

1852 births
1887 deaths
Architects from Portland, Maine
19th-century American architects
People from Lovell, Maine